Cold Metal may refer to:

Cold metal cutting saw 
"Cold Metal", song from Instinct (Iggy Pop album) 1988	
"Cold Metal", song by Ambeon, Arjen Anthony Lucassen from Fate of a Dreamer 2001